Chris Torrance (1941 – 21 August 2021) was a poet associated with the British Poetry Revival of the 1960s, mainly known for long poetry cycle The Magic Door published as a series of volumes over 30 years.

Biography 
Born in Edinburgh in 1941, Torrance grew up in London and moved to Pontneddfechan, Wales in 1970. He taught an extramural creative writing course at  University College Cardiff for 25 years. He performed literary cabaret with the poetry and music group Poetheat, which he co-founded in 1985 with composer Chris Vine, later called Heat Poets.

His work shows the influence of the Beats, especially Gary Snyder and William Burroughs and an interest in the matter and monuments of ancient Britain, including such 'magical' or religious phenomena as ley lines. He also expressed an admiration for the writings of Charles Olson and David Jones. He is one of the poets discussed in William Rowe's Three Lyric Poets (Northcote House, 2009).

Torrance has featured in a number of key Revival magazines including Poetmeat and the anthologies Children of Albion: Poetry of the Underground in Britain (1969), Conductors of Chaos (1996) and Other: British and Irish Poetry since 1970 (1999). 

His major work was the ongoing Magic Door sequence, of which eight books have been published to date by various publishers. The ninth volume, Path was prepared for publication in 2008 but was not released. In 2017 Torrance noted that there were a further three volumes in the pipeline. A collected edition of the first eight books was published in 2017 as The Magic Door by Test Centre with an introduction by Phil Maillard. The sequence follows his life at Glyn y Mercher Isaf, recording his practical activities, his love life, and his engagement with nature, mythology, geology and history. He develops the concept of a landscape filled with powers - ley lines and standing stones, pagan gods and spirits, and focuses on the nearby standing stones of Maen Madoc and Maen Llia and the 19th century house of Glan yr Afon which incorporates geological oddities and an elaborate stone archway. Torrance died on 19 September 2021 at the age of 80.

Selected publications

The Magic Door sequence
Torrance, Chris; Torrance, Val (1973) Acrospirical Meanderings in a Tongue of the Time, London, Albion Village Press

Citrinas (The Magic Door, Book II) (1977), London, Albion Village Press
The diary of Palug's Cat (The Magic Door, Book III) (1980), Newcastle upon Tyne, Galloping Dog Press', ; also Swansea, Stone Lantern Audiobook on tape oclc=20672978
The Book of Brychan (The Magic Door, Book IV) (1982), Newcastle upon Tyne, Galloping Dog Press; illustrations and cover design by Robin Campbell
Cylinder Fragments of the Twentieth Century (1982), Neath, Cwm Nedd Press,  
The Slim Book/Wet Pulp (The Magic Door, Book V) (1986), Swansea, Stone Lantern Press
Southerly Vector/The Book Of Heat – Further Books of the Magic Door (1996), Neath, Cwm Nedd Press, 
Path (The Magic Door, Book 7) (prepared by Heaventree Press, 2008, but not released)
The Magic Door (Test Centre, 2017)

Other poetry

The Rainbringer (1977), Newcastle upon Tyne, Pig Press; 2nd revised edition, 1978. 
Heat Sonnets (1979), Newcastle upon Tyne, Pig Press. 

The Book of Heat CD, Chris Torrance-Words, Chris Vine-Music (1998), Innerstar; rerelease 2003
Wobbly Chair (2003), Dinas Powys, Canna Press
Frinite CD, Chris Torrance-Words, Chris Vine-Music (2004) Dinas Powys, Canna Press
Hare Pie, card designed by Deidre Farrell (2007), signed by artist and author, Dinas Powys, Canna Press
Chris Torrance and Chris Vine Rory: A book of the boundaries 
 Thirty poems in Graham Harthill, Phil Maillard and Chris Torrance Slipping the Leash (2015), Llangattock (Powys), Aquifer Books

Critical works
"Death of the poem?", A470: what's on in literary Wales, No. 26 (Nov.-Dec. 2003), p.6.

References

External links
Chris Torrance at the Strange Attractor Web site
The Insider (profile of Chris Torrance) (Western Mail 2011) 
Obituary (The Guardian 2021) 

1941 births
2021 deaths
British poets
British Poetry Revival
Academics of Cardiff University
Writers from Edinburgh
British male poets
21st-century British male writers